Nong Bua is a district (amphoe) in the northeastern part of Nakhon Sawan province, central Thailand.

History
The government separated some tambons of Chum Saeng district, Tha Tako district, and Bang Mun Nak district of Phichit province to create the minor district (king amphoe) Nong Bua on 1 January 1948. It was upgraded to a full district on 6 June 1956.

Geography
Neighboring districts are (from the north clockwise): Bang Mun Nak and Dong Charoen of Phichit province; Chon Daen and Bueng Sam Phan of Phetchabun province; and Phaisali, Tha Tako, and Chum Saeng of Nakhon Sawan Province.

Administration
The district is divided into nine sub-districts (tambons), which are further subdivided into 105 villages (mubans). Nong Bua is a township (thesaban tambon) covering parts of tambons Nong Bua and Nong Klap. There are a further nine tambon administrative organizations (TAO).

References

Nong Bua